Biology was an indie rock band that was signed up to Vagrant Records.

Biology was a creation of From Autumn to Ashes drummer Francis Mark (guitar and vocals), Every Time I Die bassist Josh Newton (guitar), producer Brian McTernan (bass) and Cornbread Compton of Engine Down (drums).

Francis Mark is known as the lighter, more melodic, side of From Autumn to Ashes, and Biology's music reflects this clearly.

Making Moves, Biology's only album, was released September 27, 2005, via Vagrant Records.

Biology announced a breakup on April 4, 2008.

Members
Francis Mark - lead vocals, rhythm guitar, piano
Josh Newton - lead guitar, backing vocals
Dan Duggins - drums
Cornbread Compton - drums
Brian McTernan - bass, rhythm guitar

Making Moves

Track listing
 "Programming the Populous"
 "Sophisdecay"
 "The Measure of My Worth"
 "Opinions Are Like Addictions"
 "Public Art"
 "Arbitrary Stimulation"
 "New English"
 "Born Again Virgins"
 "Employment"
 "When Future History Became Current History"
 "Damaged Goods"

External links
Biology on Myspace
Biology's Purevolume site
Interview with Francis Mark - Aversion.com
Interview with Francis Mark - Anti-Mag.com
Making Moves at Amazon.com
Biology at AbsolutePunk.com

Indie rock musical groups from New York (state)
Musical groups from Long Island